Song Ban Kheng Road or Jalan Song Ban Kheng is one of the main roads in Bukit Mertajam, Penang. It runs east–west to connect with Jalan Kebun Sireh in the west, and the Jalan Maju flyover in the east. It is the main road to reach Bukit Mertajam Town from the west. From the Exit 160 (Juru Interchange) of the North–South Expressway, drivers can take Jalan Kebun Nenas followed by Jalan Chian Heng Kai to reach here. 

Lined with a number of commercial centers such as the Pusat Perniagaan Gemilang Jaya, this Road also connects to Jalan Betik, where the Bukit Mertajam Branch of Seberang Perai Municipal Council is located, with a lot of government agencies available such as the Bukit Mertajam Magistrate Court and District Land Office.

History 
Serving as a bypass from the city centre, Song Ban Kheng Road was built in 1999 outside Bukit Mertajam to cater for traffic from Bukit Tengah to Maju Jaya. It was named after Song Ban Kheng, who had been the principal for Jit Sin High School for about 20 years and was a state assemblyman for the former state constitute Pekan Bukit Mertajam in 1983. Nowadays, this road has helped in creating some new townships such as Kota Permai, Taman Gemilang Jaya, Taman Desa Damai and others. This road was made into 4 lanes with bridges on 21 March 2015.

This road is also nearby Jalan Betik, also known as Government Road, where a lot of government agencies are located, including:
Jabatan Kerja Raya
Bukit Mertajam High Court
MPSP Stadium
Central Seberang Perai District Land Office
Seberang Perai Municipal Council Bukit Mertajam Branch

References

Roads in Penang
Bukit Mertajam